Frances Hagell Smith (1877–1948) was a notable New Zealand missionary teacher and welfare worker. She was born in Oamaru, North Otago, New Zealand in 1877.

References

1877 births
1948 deaths
New Zealand schoolteachers
People from Oamaru
People educated at Waitaki Girls' High School